Vovin may refer to:

Alexander Vovin, American Professor of East Asian Languages
Vovin (album), 1998 album by Therion
In the Enochian language, a dragon